Death Rides Along is a 1967 Italian Spaghetti Western film directed by Giuseppe Vari.

Cast 

 Mike Marshall: Bobby "Idaho" Kent
 Robert Hundar: Luke Prentiss  
 Carole André: Susan
 Andrea Bosic: Bryan Talbot
 Hélène Chanel: Dolores Talbot
 Paolo Giusti: Kriss 
 John McDouglas
 Peter Martell

References

External links

 

1967 films
Spaghetti Western films
1967 Western (genre) films
Films directed by Giuseppe Vari
Films scored by Lallo Gori
1960s Italian films